NGC 2627 is an open cluster in the constellation Pyxis.  Around 15 stars are visible when viewed through binoculars.

References

External links
 

Open clusters
Pyxis (constellation)
2627